The R829 road is a regional road in Dún Laoghaire–Rathdown, Ireland connecting Monkstown and Dalkey.

The official definition of the R829 from the Roads Act 1993 (Classification of Regional Roads) Order 2012 states:

R829: Monkstown - Dalkey, County Dublin

Between its junction with R119 at Monkstown Road and its junction with R119 at Hyde Road Dalkey via Carrickbrennan Road, Mounttown Upper, Mounttown Lower, Glenageary Road Upper and Barnhill Road all in the county of Dún Laoghaire–Rathdown.</p>

See also
Roads in Ireland
National primary road
National secondary road
Regional road

References

Regional roads in the Republic of Ireland
Roads in County Dublin